The 1999–2000 Illinois Fighting Illini men's basketball team represented the University of Illinois.

Regular season
In 2000, for the third time in four seasons, Illinois advanced to the NCAA tournament, this time as a #4 seed. After defeating Penn in the opening round, the Illini season ended with a defeat to eventual national runner-up Florida. The Fighting Illini spent much of the season ranked in the Top 25, climbing as high as No. 15 in late December. An early three-game losing streak in Big Ten play put the Illini in a hole to start league play at 1-3. But, Illinois went on to win 10 of the last 12 league games before finishing second in the Big Ten tournament. During the February 19th game vs. Northwestern, the Illini would set an NCAA record fewest points allowed in the first half of a game by giving up only 6 points.  Cory Bradford earned second-team All-Big Ten honors after leading Illinois in scoring and the Big Ten in three-point field goals. Forward Brian Cook was named Co-Freshman of the Year in the conference and earned All-Tournament honors with strong play in the Big Ten tournament.

Roster

Source

Schedule
												
Source																
												

|-
!colspan=12 style="background:#DF4E38; color:white;"| Non-Conference regular season

	

|-
!colspan=9 style="background:#DF4E38; color:#FFFFFF;"|Big Ten regular season

|-
!colspan=9 style="text-align: center; background:#DF4E38"|Big Ten tournament

|-			
!colspan=9 style="text-align: center; background:#DF4E38"|NCAA tournament

|-

Player stats

NCAA basketball tournament
East regional
 Illinois 68, Pennsylvania 58
 Florida 93, Illinois 76

Awards and honors
 Frank Williams
Fighting Illini All-Century team (2005)
Brian Cook
Big Ten Freshman of the Year
Fighting Illini All-Century team (2005)
Cory Bradford
Team Most Valuable Player

Rankings

References

Illinois Fighting Illini
Illinois Fighting Illini men's basketball seasons
Illinois
Illinois Fighting Illini men's basketball team
Illinois Fighting Illini men's basketball team